USS Clinton is a name used more than once by the U.S. Navy:

 , a screw tug purchased 14 June 1864.
 , an attack transport commissioned 1 February 1945.

References 

United States Navy ship names